Henry Sellon Boneval Latrobe (1793–1817) was an American architect noted for his work in and around New Orleans. He was the son of Benjamin Henry Latrobe by his first wife.

He was educated at St. Mary's College in Baltimore and joined his father's firm upon graduation.

Among his works were the first Christ Church New Orleans, the fourth Charity Hospital building, and the Frank's Island Light. He died of yellow fever on September 3, 1817, while supervising construction of the waterworks designed by his father.

References

American architects
1793 births
1817 deaths
Latrobe family